"You Will You Won't" is a single by The Zutons. It is the second single from their debut album Who Killed...... The Zutons?. The single peaked at #22 in the UK singles charts.

The song is distinguished by the strident, catchy refrain which happens to serve as its title. The video contains a sequence involving unusual lighting effects with decidedly comic results.

Track listing

CD
"You Will You Won't"
"Nobody Loves Me"
"Times Of Trouble"
"You Will You Won't" (Video)

7"
"You Will You Won't"
"Nightmare (Part 1)"

References

The Zutons songs
2004 singles
2004 songs
Song recordings produced by Ian Broudie